Punisher War Journal or The Punisher War Journal is an American comic book series published from 2006 to 2009 by Marvel Comics featuring the character Frank Castle, also known as the vigilante the Punisher. It is the second series under the title The Punisher War Journal. Unlike the main Punisher series (which was published under Marvel's MAX imprint and was set in a more realistic world) at the time of its publishing the events of this edition of War Journal take place in the main Marvel Universe, Earth-616. The series was mainly written by Matt Fraction and drawn by Howard Chaykin.

The series takes place over the late stages of the infamous Civil War storyline and it's following arc The Death of Captain America, following Frank Castle and focuses on his relationship with Steve Rogers, (Captain America), whom he deeply admires despite their fundamental differences and his method of dealing with his death. Following Rogers's assassination at the hands of Crossbones and Dr. Faustus (through a hypnotized Sharon Carter), Castle decides to honor him by killing a white supremacist tarnishing his name using a modified version of Rogers' uniform, while Punisher dons a new uniform of his own with the same inspiration. The series spawned a spin-off named Punisher in 2009.

Publication history

Plot
The series consisted of several story-arcs, "How I Won The War" spaning issues 1–3, "The Initiative" spaning issues 6—11, "Hunter/Hunted" spaning issues 13–15, "Jigsaw" for issue 18—23 and "Secret Invasion" lasting from issue 24 to 25. Several short stories between the main storylines are also featured for some issues.

"How I Won The War"

"The Initiative"

"Hunter/Hunted"

"Jigsaw"

"Secret Invasion"

Reception

Sales

Critical response
The series holds an average rating of 7.3 by sixty-one professional critics on the review aggregation website Comic Book Roundup. The series was one of the most acclaimed new series of 2007.

Timothy Callahan of Comic Book Resources expressed about the series that the author, Matt Fraction, has alternated between writing a clever, witty looks at the Marvel Universe and serious and severe looks at the screwed-up world in which the character of Frank Castle lives. He also stated that while the tone was not exactly consistent from arc to arc, he did not see that as a drawback at all, because the Punisher in his most general form is not a character that works for interesting in the long term in his opinion. "The Punisher is an inconsistent character, really, if you take into account all of his in-Universe portrayals over the years. He's been a buffoonish killer, a monster, a hero, a lunatic, a patriot, and almost anything you can imagine. Fraction has written him as a strange combination of all of those things, and if he isn't heroic in a traditional sense, at least he has a code he follows. He's a psychopath headlining a book set in the Marvel Universe, and Fraction has made him compelling and somewhat noble, while never going so far as to make Frank Castle admirable." Callahan also praised Chaykin's art.

Prints

Issues

Annuals

Collected editions

See also
 2006 in comics
 2007 in comics
 2008 in comics
 2009 in comics

Notes

References

External links
 Punisher War Journal at the Comic Book DB

2006 comics debuts
2009 comics endings
Comics set in New York City
Punisher titles